NGC 348 is a spiral galaxy in the constellation Phoenix. It was discovered on October 3, 1834 by John Herschel. It was described by Dreyer as "extremely faint, small, round."

References

0348
18341003
Phoenix (constellation)
Spiral galaxies
Discoveries by John Herschel
003632